V106 was a torpedo boat of the Imperial German Navy, built in the A.G Vulcan Shipyard in 1914. She was originally ordered by the Dutch Navy and confiscated by Germany at the start of World War I; being scrapped in 1920.

Design 
V106 was designed by Stettiner Maschinenbau A.G. Vulcan shipyard as a torpedo boat for the Dutch Navy, as part one in a class of four sister ships (Z-1 to Z-4). Displacement was  normal and  full load.

She was designed to carry an armament of two 75 mm (3-inch) guns and four 450 mm torpedo tubes, but she was completed with an armament of two 5.2 cm SK L/55 guns (capable of firing a  shell to a range of ) and two 450 mm torpedo tubes.

History 

V106 was originally ordered by the Koninklijke Marine (Dutch Navy) as the torpedo boat Z-2 (along with her sister ships Z-1, Z-3 and Z-4), one of four  (Dutch: Very large) torpedo boats to be built by A.G. Vulcan in their Stettin, Germany (now in Poland) shipyard. The four ships were taken over while still under construction on 10 August 1914 owing to the outbreak of the First World War. She was launched on 26 August 1915 and commissioned in  the Kaiserliche Marine (German Navy) on 25 January 1915.

She was used as a training vessel and a tender during the war. She, along with sister ship , was allocated to Brazil in the Treaty of Versailles, but was almost immediately sold and broken up for scrap in Britain in 1920.

See also 
 German ocean-going torpedo boats of World War I
 Sister ships
 ORP Mazur (ex-V105)
 ORP Kaszub (1921) (ex-V108)
 SMS V107

References

Notes

Bibliography

Further reading

External links 

 http://www.battleships-cruisers.co.uk/german_destroyers.htm

Ships built in Stettin
1914 ships
World War I torpedo boats of Germany
Torpedo boats of the Imperial German Navy